The Lord of Arran was a title for the lord of Arran, Scotland in High Medieval Scotland.

Lords of Arran

John de Menteith

See also
Hugh Bisset
Earl of Arran (Scotland)

References
Paul, James Balfour; The Scots Peerage, (Edinburgh, 1909)

Isle of Arran
History of North Ayrshire
Feudalism in Scotland